Audouin is a surname. Notable people with the surname include:
 François-Xavier Audouin (1765–1837), French clergyman and politician
 Jean Victoire Audouin (1797–1841), French naturalist
 Pierre Audouin (1768–1822), French engraver

See also
 Audouin Dollfus (1924–2010), a French astronomer and aeronaut
 La Jarrie-Audouin, a commune in the Charente-Maritime department in southwestern France
 Audoin, king of the Lombards from 547 to 560
 Audoin (bishop) (609–684), a Frankish bishop, courtier, hagiographer and saint